Villa Alta District is located in the center of the Sierra Norte Region of the State of Oaxaca, Mexico.
It has an area of 1,156 km2 of mountainous country, divided into 25 municipalities.

As of 2007 there were 99 settlements of which 72 had electricity and 38 had a supply of potable water in 2007.
As of 2005 the total population was 29,009.
The main food crops are maize and beans.
Coffee is the most important cash crop, and there is some sugar cane production.

Municipalities

The district includes the following municipalities:

References

Districts of Oaxaca
Sierra Norte de Oaxaca